Svetlana Kopystiansky (born  in Voronezh) is an American artist, active in New York City since 1988. She has a multimedia practice, including painting, photography, film, and video, with an investigation of language as her primary paradigm. On works in media of film and video, she collaborates with her husband Igor Kopystiansky. Her  independent works and their joint works are shown internationally and held in museum and private collections around the world. 
Archives by Igor and Svetlana Kopystiansky are located at the Centre Pompidou, Kandinsky Library.

Biography
Kopystiansky was born 11 November 1950 in Voronezh, Russia, and from late Seventies until late Eighties was part of a second-generation of "Soviet non-conformist artists" w.  In 1979, Svetlana Kopystiansky turned to the avant-garde tradition. Her Correct Figures/Incorrect Figures (1979) commented on the work of Malevich, while White Album (1979) was based on the concept of the “found object” introduced by Marcel Duchamp. The works on paper Plays mimicked Samuel Beckett's deadpan humor and meditations on life's banality and contained a reference to Alexander Rodchenko’s ideas. Kopystiansky started working on her two conceptually and formally related series- Landscapes and Seascapes- in 1980. Both series merge text with image: a closer look at either a landscape or seascape reveals a pattern of handwritten text filling the canvas, with excerpts borrowed from classic authors, such as Leo Tolstoy, Beckett and Paul Eluard.

In 1988, she and her husband and collaborator Igor Kopystiansky left the Soviet Union and moved to New York City, which has been their home base since then. In 1990 in New York Svetlana started a new series of large scale sculptures and installation works constructed from editions of books as found objects or readymades. In this group of works real books were placed in wooden boxes in a way that they become visual objects with pages open towards the viewer. For these works were used editions of novels in English.  In 1990, Svetlana and Igor Kopystiansky received a DAAD artists-in-residency grant that brought them to Berlin, Germany, and resulted in their first solo museum exhibition with a catalogue, "In the Tradition," curated by René Block for the Berlinische Galerie, Museum of Modern Art, in the Martin Gropius-Bau, Berlin in 1991.

In the 1990s, her individual and joint practice expanded and the work was shown in major international presentations, including the 1992 Sydney Biennial, the 1994 Sao Paulo Biennial, 1997's Skulpture Projekt, Münster. and documenta 11 in 2002, and collected by museums including the Museum of Modern Art, Metropolitan Museum and Whitney Museum of American Art  in New York, Art Institute of Chicago, Museum of Fine Arts, Houston, Smithsonian American Art Museum, Washington D.C.; Henry Art Gallery in Seattle; Zimmerli Art Museum, Rutgers University, New Jersey; Musée National d'Art Moderne Center Pompidou, Paris; Musée d'Art Moderne de Saint-Etienne Métropole, France; Tate Modern, London; Art Gallery of New South Wales, Sydney; Museo Nacional Reina Sofia; Folkwang Museum in Essen; Ludwig Forum for International Art, Aachen; Berlinische Galerie; Museum für Moderne Kunst, Frankfurt am Main; MUMOK Vienna, Austria; Centre for Contemporary Art Luigi Pecci, Prato, Italy; Frac Corsica, France; MOCAK, Museum of Contemporary Art Krakow, Poland; Muzeum Sztuki Lodz, Poland.

Increasingly the Kopystianskys make video.  Their 1996-7 video Incidents, filmed on streets of Chelsea Manhattan was first shown by curator Harald Szeemann in the Lyon Biennale in 1997, meditates on the potential beauty and pathos of discarded objects, as they are balletically blown around by wind along a city street. Later collaborations, such as 2005's Yellow Sound harks back to Svetlana's citations, within her 1980s paintings, of modernist masters. Yellow Sound takes its title from a Wassily Kandinsky theater production, and its silent structure and running time from John Cage's famous composition 4'33" (1952), in which a piano player sits at the keyboard, lift the lid and stay motionless and silent for the next four minutes and thirty-three seconds. A 2006 film installation, Pink & White-A Play in Two Time Directions, features eight projections showing black-and-white found footage, emphasizing their interest in early cinema, and the surrealist graphic intensity of photographer Man Ray. Lisson Gallery in London represented them from 2001 to 2011.

Honors and awards 
In 2000, Kopystiansky was awarded the Käthe-Kollwitz-Preis by the Akademie der Künste, Berlin, Germany, and in 2008 she received a Residences Internationales aux Recollets in Paris, France.

Publications

 ‘'Kopystiansky: Double Fiction/Fiction Double”. Published on the occasion of the solo exhibition at the Musée d"Art Moderne de Saint-Étienne. 2010. Texts by John G. Hanhardt, Philippe-Alain Michaud. Les Presses du Réel. 
 "Igor & Svetlana Kopystiansky." Published on the occasion of the solo exhibition at the EMMA – Espoo Museum of Modern Art, Helsinki, 2007. Texts by Timo Valjakka, Anthony Spira, Barry Schwabsky, (English, Finnish, Swedish), EMMA – Espoo Museum of Modern Art, Helsinki. 
 “Igor & Svetlana Kopystiansky: The Day before Tomorrow”. Published on the occasion of the solo exhibition at the Kunsthalle Fridericianum, Kassel and Fine Arts Centre of UMass, Amherst, Massachusetts, 2005. With introduction by René Block and Loretta Yarlow and texts by Adam D. Weinberg, Barry Schwabsky, Andreas Bee, Anthony Bond, Kai-Uwe Hemken. (English and German), 
 “Igor & Svetlana Kopystiansky: Tracking Shot.” With texts by Barry Schwabsky, Andreas Bee, Anthony Bond. (English and Spanish), Distrito4, 2004. Madrid, Spain 
 “Svetlana Kopystiansky: Käthe-Kollwitz-Preis 2000.” Akademie der Künste, Berlin. 
 “Svetlana Kopystiansky: El Jardî." With a text by Joseph M. Camarasa. Institut Botànic Barcelona, Institut de Cultura, Double Lives, Barcelona, 1999. 
 “Igor & Svetlana Kopystiansky: Dialog,” Published on the occasion of the solo exhibition at the IFA Galerie Berlin, 1998. Institut für Auslandsbeziehungen Stuttgart/Berlin.
 “Svetlana Kopystiansky: Workers Library.” 2nd Johannesburg Biennale, 1997. 
 “Svetlana Kopystiansky: The Library.” Published on the occasion of the solo exhibition at the Kunsthalle Düsseldorf, Germany. 1994.
 “Igor and Svetlana Kopystiansky” Published on the occasion of the solo exhibition at the Martin-Gropius-Bau Berlin, 1991. DAAD. Curator René Block. Texts by Dan Cameron, Joachim Sartorius, Christine Tacke. 
 “Svetlana Kopystiansky: Shadow of Gravitation,” Published on the occasion of the solo exhibition at The Art Institute of Chicago, 1996. Publisher: Buro Orange Siemens AG Kulturstiftung Siemens.

References 

Artist Website: 

1950 births
20th-century American artists
American people of Russian descent
Living people
People from Voronezh
20th-century American women artists
21st-century American women